Hrustovo refers to the following places:

 Hrustovo, Velike Lašče, village in Slovenia
 Hrustovo, Sanski Most, village in Bosnia and Herzegovina